People Mountain People Sea may refer to:

People Mountain People Sea (label), a Hong Kong record label
People Mountain People Sea (film), a 2011 Chinese film